The Invisible Kid is a 1988 American teen science fiction comedy film written and directed by Avery Crounse. The film stars Jay Underwood, Wally Ward, Chynna Phillips, Brother Theodore, and Karen Black.

Plot
Following in his deceased father's footsteps, Grover Dunn finds a magic formula that makes him vanish. The formula causes all types of trouble for Grover and his mother and the love of his life when his high school principal rigs a basketball game; and he enlists the aid of a put-down cop to investigate.

Cast
 Jay Underwood as Grover Dunn
 Wally Ward as Milton McClane
 Chynna Phillips as Cindy Moore
 Brother Theodore as Dr. Theodore
 Karen Black as Deborah Dunn
 Mike Genovese as Officer Chuck Malone

Reception
Caryn James of The New York Times wrote that it "proves you can cull every known cliche from successful teen adventure films and still come up with a bomb". Michael Wilmington of the Los Angeles Times wrote, "Blank leader projected on the screen would have been an improvement".

References

External links
 
 

1988 films
1988 comedy films
1988 independent films
1988 science fiction films
1980s fantasy comedy films
1980s science fiction comedy films
1980s teen comedy films
1980s teen fantasy films
American fantasy comedy films
American independent films
American science fantasy films
American science fiction comedy films
American teen comedy films
1980s English-language films
Films shot in Los Angeles
1980s American films